Martin Dirk Muller (born 23 March 1988) is a South African rugby union player, played with Hong Kong Premiership side Valley RFC. His regular playing position is lock.

Career

In 2010, he moved to Kimberley to join . After just one appearance, he was included in the  Super Rugby team and made eleven appearances for them.

After it was initially announced that he would join Welsh team Newport Gwent Dragons for 2013–14, the deal fell through and he linked up with the  prior to the 2013 Currie Cup Premier Division instead. After two appearances in that competition, he was elevated to the Super Rugby side, making five appearances during the 2014 season.

Despite media sources reporting that he signed for French side  for the 2014–2015 season, Muller remained in Johannesburg and appeared in ten of the ' matches of the 2014 Currie Cup Premier Division, including playing in the 2014 Currie Cup.

References

External links

itsrugby.co.uk profile

Living people
1988 births
South African rugby union players
Rugby union players from Cape Town
Rugby union locks
Griquas (rugby union) players
Western Province (rugby union) players
Stormers players
Cheetahs (rugby union) players
Lions (United Rugby Championship) players
Golden Lions players
South Africa Under-20 international rugby union players
Barbarian F.C. players
Valley RFC players
South African expatriate sportspeople in Hong Kong
Expatriate rugby union players in Hong Kong
South African expatriate rugby union players